Skippack Township is a township in Montgomery County, Pennsylvania, United States. The population was 13,715 at the 2010 census. This represents a 110.5% increase from the 2000 count of 6,516 residents.

History
The Kuster Mill was listed on the National Register of Historic Places in 1971.

Geography
According to the United States Census Bureau, the township has a total area of 14.0 square miles (36.2 km2), of which 13.8 square miles (35.8 km2) is land and 0.2 square miles (0.4 km2) (1.14%) is water. The 2006 Skippack Township Municipal Directory lists the population as 9,920 (including 3,404 at SCI Phoenix). The Perkiomen Creek forms its natural western boundary and drains it into the Schuylkill River. Its villages include Creamery, Lucon, Providence Square (also in Worcester Township), and Skippack.

Neighboring municipalities
Lower Salford Township (northeast)
Towamencin Township (east)
Worcester Township (southeast)
Lower Providence Township (south)
Collegeville (tangent to the southwest)
Perkiomen Township (west)

Climate
The township has a hot-summer humid continental climate (Dfa) and average monthly temperatures in the village of Skippack range from 30.7 °F in January to 75.4 °F in July.  The hardiness zones are 6b and 7a.

Transportation

The main highways serving Skippack Township are Pennsylvania Route 73 and Pennsylvania Route 113. PA 73 follows Skippack Pike along a northwest-southeast alignment across the northern and northeastern portions of the township, while PA 113 traverses northeast-to-southwest along Bridge Road.

SEPTA provides Suburban Bus service to Skippack Township along Route 91, which provides Saturday service between the Norristown Transportation Center in Norristown and State Correctional Institution – Phoenix.

Institutions
The main industry is the State Correctional Institution – Phoenix, which replaced State Correctional Institution – Graterford in 2018. Prison factories and industries employ 21 civilian staff and 315 inmate staff. An example is the Garment Factory which provides inmates with shirts, trousers, insulated coveralls, baseball caps, bibs, and handkerchiefs.

The main attractions to Skippack are Evansburg State Park, the Central Montgomery Park and the historic shopping village, Skippack Village.  The State Park offers a variety of recreational opportunities including hunting, fishing, horse back riding and an 18-hole golf course.

Demographics

As of the 2010 census, the township was 75.0% White, 16.6% Black or African American, 0.1% Native American, 3.6% Asian, and 1.2% were two or more races. 4.7% of the population were of Hispanic or Latino ancestry.

As of the census of 2000, there were 6,516 people, 2,353 households, and 1,828 families residing in the township.  The population density was 471.0 people per square mile (181.9/km2).  There were 2,477 housing units at an average density of 179.0/sq mi (69.2/km2).  The racial makeup of the township was 95.75% White, 2.16% African American, 0.28% Native American, 0.91% Asian, 0.40% from other races, and 0.51% from two or more races. Hispanic or Latino of any race were 1.20% of the population.

There were 2,353 households, out of which 37.2% had children under the age of 18 living with them, 69.0% were married couples living together, 6.7% had a female householder with no husband present, and 22.3% were non-families. 17.4% of all households were made up of individuals, and 3.9% had someone living alone who was 65 years of age or older.  The average household size was 2.73 and the average family size was 3.12.

In the township the population was spread out, with 26.7% under the age of 18, 5.3% from 18 to 24, 36.7% from 25 to 44, 22.8% from 45 to 64, and 8.4% who were 65 years of age or older.  The median age was 36 years. For every 100 females there were 97.2 males.  For every 100 females age 18 and over, there were 97.9 males.

The median income for a household in the township was $71,566, and the median income for a family was $78,043. Males had a median income of $52,423 versus $40,081 for females. The per capita income for the township was $30,199.  About 1.1% of families and 1.8% of the population were below the poverty line, including 1.6% of those under age 18 and none of those age 65 or over.

Government and politics

Skippack Township is run by an elected five person Board of Supervisors, each of whom serve staggered six year terms. The current supervisors are Chairman Franco D'Angelo (R), Vice Chairman Paul Fox (R), Nick Fountain (R), Ben Webb (I) and Barbara McGinnis (R).

Other elected offices include the Tax Collector, Laurie Augustine (R), the Board of Auditors, Tom Biggar (D), Phil Wimpenney (D) and Bohdan Marchuk (R) and the Constable, Luke DiElsi (R).

The Pennsylvania Department of Corrections operates the State Correctional Institution – Phoenix in Skippack Township; it has a Collegeville postal address. The department formerly operated the State Correctional Institution - Graterford within the township. SCI Graterford closed in July 2018 and was replaced by SCI Phoenix.

Education
Perkiomen Valley School District operates public schools.

Most residents are zoned to Skippack Elementary School, while some are zoned to Schwenksville Elementary School. Some residents are zoned to Middle School West while others are zoned to Middle School East. All district residents are zoned to Perkiomen Valley High School.

References

External links

 Skippack Township
 Skippack Volunteer Fire Company
 Skippack Lions Club

Townships in Montgomery County, Pennsylvania